Grewe is a surname. Notable people with the surname include:

Constance Grewe (born 1946), German judge and legal scholar
David Grewe (born 1976), American baseball player and coach
Sam Grewe (born 1998), American Paralympic high jumper
Wilhelm Grewe (1911–2000), German diplomat and professor

See also
Grew
Grue (disambiguation)